Richard Thomas Knowles (December 20, 1916 – September 18, 2013) was a United States Army lieutenant general, who served as assistant commander of the 1st Cavalry Division and as commander of the 196th Light Infantry Brigade and Task Force Oregon during the Vietnam War.

Early life and education
Knowles was born on 20 December 1916 in Chicago.

Knowles attended the University of Illinois and joined the ROTC program there.

Military service
Knowles joined the United States Army in 1942 and took part in the Normandy Landings.

Korean War
Knowles took part in the Inchon Landings and was later awarded the Silver Star.

On 10 February 1964, Knowles was named as acting assistant division commander of the 11th Air Assault Division and nominated for promotion to brigadier general.

Vietnam War
Knowles served as assistant division commander of the 1st Cavalry Division in 1965 during which time he supported the relief of the Siege of Plei Me.

Knowles served as commander of the 196th Light Infantry Brigade. In July 1967, MG Knowles assumed command of Task Force Oregon into which the 196th was subsumed.

Post-Vietnam
Knowles served as commander of I Corps from 1 August 1972 to 17 July 1973. He retired from the army in 1974.

Later career
Knowles served as a Republican representative in the New Mexico State legislature for 16 years from 1983 to 1998.

He died on 18 September 2013 at his home in Roswell, New Mexico and was buried at Arlington National Cemetery.

References

1916 births
2013 deaths
United States Army personnel of World War II
United States Army personnel of the Korean War
United States Army personnel of the Vietnam War
United States Army generals
Military personnel from Chicago
Recipients of the Distinguished Service Medal (US Army)